These are The Official UK Charts Company UK Dance Chart number one hits of 1999. The dates listed in the menus below represent the Saturday after the Sunday the chart was announced, as per the way the dates are given in chart publications such as the ones produced by Billboard, Guinness, and Virgin.

See also
1999 in music

References

External links
Dance Singles Chart at The Official UK Charts Company
UK Top 40 Dance Singles at BBC Radio 1

UK Dance
1999 in British music
1999